XLI3H (leet for Greek:Εξέλιξη meaning Evolution) is a hip hop album by 2008 MTV EMA Winner for Best Greek Act Stereo Mike and was released by Minos EMI. Stereo Mike is also the producer of the album.

The album features many collaborations with other artists including Haris Alexiou, Andiana Babali, Shaya, Lagnis {N.T.P.}, Mihos24, Reggae Philharmonic Orchestra, Skrein, Sandman, Ghetto Priest and Zeraw (Tang-Ram).

Chart performance

Sources

 Music Corner
 MAD TV Greece
 MAD TV Greece

2007 albums
Greek-language albums
Minos EMI albums
Stereo Mike albums